Cecilia Cenci (3 August 1942 – 21 September 2014)  was an Argentinian film, stage and television actress. She was born in La Plata.

Career
Cecilia Cenci studied dramatic art at the School of Theatre in La Plata, participating in the mid-1960s in the old Channel 7 in the show Guide for Parents. On the big screen, she made her debut with the film The Pig War (1975) with José Slavin, and Marta González. However, it was in the 1980s when Cenci reached her career climax. She worked on several films until 1993 when she played the character of Eva Peron in the film Gatica, el Mono, directed by Leonardo Favio.
On the small screen she was showcased in various comedian and melodramatic roles.  In 1980 she won a starring role opposite Germán Kraus in the telenovelas Rosas para su enamorada and Donde pueda quererte. In Chile she starred as the wife in Andrea, Justicia de Mujer (1984).  She appeared in several soap operas with international projection in antagonistic roles as in María de nadie, with Grecia Colmenares and Jorge Martinez and the telenovela Mujer comprada, with Mayra Alejandra and Arturo Puig. One of her most notable roles was that of Felicia del Molino López de Espada in the telenovela Nano (1994), with Araceli González . Her last television appearance was playing another villainous character, but this time with a humorous touch, in the soap opera Por Amor a Vos starring Miguel Angel Rodriguez and Claribel Medina.  

She also did a notable union work and served as president of the Argentina Actors Association during 2008-2011.  She was also president of the Social Work Actors from December 2006 until March 2014.

She died at dawn on 21 September 2014, at age 72 of brain cancer. She died at the Favaloro Foundation in Buenos Aires and was buried in the cemetery of the Argentina Actors Association of the Chacarita Cemetery.

Filmography
1975: The Pig War 
1976: The Fat Man of America 
1976: Free Stone 
1977: The show producer 
1979: Backlash 
1979: Dolls that make boom! 
1981: While life lasts me 
1982: The house of the seven tombs 
1988: Thanks for the services 
1993: Gatica, the "Monkey", playing Evita

Television
1980: Where I can love you 
1980: An angel in the city as Sandra 
1980: Roses for your love 
1980: Barracas to the south 
1981: The cycle of Guillermo Bredeston and Nora Cárpena 
1981: El Rafa 
1981/1982: Learning to Live 
1982: The East 
1982/1983: Every day the same story 
1984: Andrea, Women's Justice like Andrea 
1985: Mary of nobody as Ivana 
1986: Purchased Woman as Laura Simonal 
1987: Estrellita mine as Cristina 
1988/1989: We're made of meat 
1989: So are the mine ones 
1989: The plays of Dario Vittori (episode "The babe is going") 
1991: Buenos Aires, tell me about love as Mercedes 
1991: Unforgettable as Dr. Gutiérrez 
1994: Nano as Felicia del Molino López de Espada  
1997: Sacred Love as Mercedes 
1997: Mine, only mine as Angelina Zamorano 
2008: For loving you as Elvira Batani Molinari

Theatre
1979: Coexistence, directed by Roberto Duran in Regina Theatre 
The Navel 
Arsenic and Old Lace 
Trees die standing 
1993: What a night of marriage by Ivo Pelay 
Affectionately Evita 
The force of nature 
Love the outdoors 
Des-displaced 
Storms' Tamer 
Tute Cabrero 
2009: González 
2013: To bribe the oblivion

References

1942 births
2014 deaths
20th-century Argentine actresses
21st-century Argentine actresses
Argentine film actresses
Argentine stage actresses
Argentine telenovela actresses
Argentine television actresses
Argentine trade union leaders
Deaths from brain cancer in Argentina
People from La Plata